Erythrophleum ivorense is a species of leguminous tree in the genus Erythrophleum found in the rainforests of tropical West and Central Africa. The tree has many uses; the timber is used for heavy construction, for making charcoal and for firewood, the bark is used for tanning and in traditional medicine, and both bark and seeds are poisonous and used for hunting.

Description
The bark is grey, scaly and fissured, and the inner bark is granular and reddish. The young twigs are downy and the alternate, bi-pinnate leaves each have up to seven pairs of alternately-arranged ovate leaflets and a terminal leaflet. The flowers are reddish-brown and hairy, with parts in fives, and are followed by flat, leathery, dangling seed pods, each containing up to six seeds.

Distribution and habitat
Erythrophleum ivorenseis native to tropical West Africa where its range extends from The Gambia to Gabon and the Central African Republic. It occurs in evergreen and moist, semi-deciduous forest, primarily in mature second-growth forest. The roots often bear nodules containing Bradyrhizobium, bacteria which are capable of nitrogen fixation.

Uses
The timber is very durable and is traded internationally. It is used for heavy construction, bridges, wharves and railway sleepers, as well as for boat building and wheel hubs. However the sawdust is irritating to the mucosa and may causes asthma and allergies to workers in sawmills. The wood makes good charcoal and firewood. The bark is used in tanning and has several uses in traditional medicine. Both the bark and the seeds are toxic and are used in hunting, and in Sierra Leone, the bark is used to poison fish.

References

ivorense
Trees of Africa
Flora of West Tropical Africa
Flora of West-Central Tropical Africa
Plants used in traditional African medicine
Taxa named by Auguste Chevalier